Ganotantri Party, (Bengali: 
গণতন্ত্রি পার্টি, English: Democratic Party),  is a left-wing political party in Bangladesh. The party is closely aligned with Bangladesh Awami League. Barrister Arosh Ali is the President and Dr Shahadat Hossain is the General Secretary of the Ganotantri Party.

History

Suranjit Sengupta was elected to Parliament from Sunamganj-2 on a Ganotantri Party nomination. He left the Ganotantri Party in 2001 and joined Bangladesh Awami League.

The Party's former President of the Party, Nurul Islam, died in a fire at his home in December 2009 before the 9th parliamentary election in which he was the candidate of the Grand Alliance in Noakhali-1. There were some allegations from his allies and family members that he was murdered.

References

 
Political history of Bangladesh
Political parties in Bangladesh
Socialist parties in Asia
Socialist parties in Bangladesh